Matthew Fitz David Robinson is a former Wales International Rugby Union player. A centre or wing, Robinson began his rugby career at Newport High School Old Boys before joining Swansea.

He made his debut for the Wales on 6 February 1999 versus Scotland went on to attain 4 caps for Wales during 1999.

Robinson also played List A cricket for Herefordshire and a combined Minor Counties team.  He also played Minor counties cricket for Herefordshire.

Matthew was educated at King's College, Taunton in Somerset.

Matthew now lives in Devon with his wife Michelle Griffith (British Triple Jumper) and three children and is Director of Boarding at West Buckland School.

References

External links
Wales profile

Living people
1973 births
Rugby union players from Cardiff
People educated at King's College, Taunton
Wales international rugby union players
Newport HSOB RFC players
Swansea RFC players
Ospreys (rugby union) players
Newport RFC players
Welsh cricketers
Herefordshire cricketers
Minor Counties cricketers
Rugby union wings